"Hyperactive!" is a single by British musician Thomas Dolby, taken from his second album The Flat Earth, released in 1984. Backing vocals were provided by Adele Bertei. Additional spoken word vocals were provided by Louise Ulfstedt and Kevin Armstrong as "The Analyst."

According to Thomas Dolby, he initially composed the song for Michael Jackson, whom he met in 1982. He decided to record it by himself since he never got any feedback from Jackson after sending him a demo tape.

It was the first single to be taken from the album and peaked at number 17 on the UK Singles Chart and number 16 on the Canadian RPM Magazine charts, but only reached number 62 on the US Billboard Hot 100.

Chart positions

In other media
The song appeared in the 2002 video game Grand Theft Auto: Vice City on the fictional in-game radio station "Wave 103".

In 2017, the song was featured over the second episode closing credits of the FX series Legion.

The song appears in the ninth episode of fourth season of Breaking Bad.

References

1984 singles
1984 songs
Thomas Dolby songs
EMI Records singles
Capitol Records singles
Songs written by Thomas Dolby